Beijing Automobile Works is a China-based automotive manufacturing company.

Baw can mean the following:
 the Burmese name of Maw, one of the Shan states in 19th to 20th centuries locating in today's Burma

BAW can also be the acronym of the following:
 the ICAO airline designation of British Airways
 the National Rail station code of Blackwater railway station, Blackwater, Hart
 Brain Awareness Week, a neuroscience organization